Blastodacna is a genus of moths of the family Elachistidae.

Distribution
Blastodacna  species are found in the Holarctic, although most species are native to the Palearctic.

Taxonomy
The genus is mostly placed in the family Elachistidae, but other authors list it as a member of the family Agonoxenidae or even assign it its own family, the Blastodacnidae.

Species
Blastodacna atra (Haworth, 1828)
Blastodacna bicristatella (Chambers, 1875)
Blastodacna curvilineella (Chambers, 1872)
Blastodacna erebopis Meyrick, 1934
Blastodacna georgiella Sinev, 1988
Blastodacna hellerella (Duponchel, 1838)
Blastodacna libanotica Diakonoff, 1939
Blastodacna lvovskyi Sinev, 1986
Blastodacna mandshurica Sinev, 1988
Blastodacna mironovi Sinev, 1989
Blastodacna ochrella Sugisima, 2004
Blastodacna pyrigalla (Yang, 1977)
Blastodacna rossica Sinev, 1989
Blastodacna vinolentella (Herrich-Schäffer, 1854)

Former species
Blastodacna cinnamomina Turati, 1930

References

 
Parametriotinae
Moth genera